Bedina Varoš is a town in the municipality of Ivanjica, Serbia. According to the 2011 census, the town has a population of 1,680 inhabitants.

References

External links

Populated places in Moravica District